Salanjeh Zaruni (also Romanized as Salanjeh Ẕarūnī; also known as ʿAlī Ḩoseyn) is a village in Kuhdasht-e Shomali Rural District, in the Central District of Kuhdasht County, Lorestan Province, Iran. At the 2006 census, its population was 44, in 7 families.

References 

Towns and villages in Kuhdasht County